Buying Time is a 1989 Canadian action film directed by Mitchell Gabourie and written by Mitchell Gabourie, Richard Gabourie, Gordon McDonald and Dean Gabourie. The film stars Jeff Schultz, Laura Cruickshank, Page Fletcher, Leslie Toth and Dean Stockwell. The film was released on May 12, 1989, by United Artists.

Plot
A low-budget crime drama set in Toronto concerning a couple of likable petty thieves, Jabber and Reno (Jeff Schultz and Leslie Toth), who are forced by the police (Dean Stockwell) to go undercover to discover who is killing the city's drug dealers.

Cast

References

External links 
 

1989 films
English-language Canadian films
United Artists films
Canadian action films
1989 action films
1980s English-language films
1980s Canadian films